Mohammed Sayyar (Arabic:محمد سيار) (born 16 February 1991) is a Qatari born-Bahrein footballer. He currently plays for Al-Arabi plays as a midfielder or defender.

External links
 

Qatari footballers
1991 births
Living people
Al-Gharafa SC players
Al-Shahania SC players
Al-Khor SC players
Al-Rayyan SC players
Al-Arabi SC (Qatar) players
Naturalised citizens of Qatar
Qatar Stars League players
Qatari Second Division players
Association football midfielders
Association football defenders